Philippe de France, Duke of Orléans was the brother of Louis XIV of France and the younger son of Louis XIII of France and Anne of Austria.

A member of the House of Bourbon, he is the founder of the current House of Orléans. His heirs formed a junior collateral branch of the royal dynasty. They include the second duke, who governed France during the minority of Louis XV in the Regency era; one French monarch, Louis Philippe I; and the Orléanist pretenders to the French throne still flourishing in the 21st century. The accumulation of the vast wealth which the House of Orléans would possess and use to influence both politics and court life (until it was confiscated during the French Revolution) began with Philippe, a lifelong beneficiary of his brother's largesse.

He was originally known by the title "Duke of Anjou". In 1660, his paternal uncle, Gaston, Duke of Orléans, died. The dukedom of Orléans was an appanage traditionally conferred upon the younger brother of the French king whenever available. Philippe exchanged Anjou for Orléans. As a son of a French king, Philippe ranked as a fils de France, and as the king's younger brother, he was invariably referred to at court simply as Monsieur.

Issue by Henrietta-Anne 'Minette' of England

Henrietta Anne and Philippe : Relationship Background

On 31 March 1661, he married his first cousin, Princess Henrietta of England, daughter of King Charles I of England, in the chapel of the Palais-Royal in Paris. Both were grandchildren of Henry IV of France and Marie de' Medici. She was known at court as Madame, Henriette d'Angleterre (Henrietta of England) or affectionately as Minette and was a famed beauty. 
Philippe was said to have doted on Henriette for the first year of their marriage, but their relationship soon turned sour when she allegedly began an affair with the Count of Guiche and went on to seek comfort from others. Philippe openly paraded his mignons in front of his wife and the whole court. Among them were Armand de Gramont, Count of Guiche, known for his arrogance and good looks, the marquis de Châtillon, and his first lover Philip Julian Mancini. Meanwhile, Henriette proved to be very popular at court as a pretty, good-natured princess, much to Philippe's annoyance.

She soon attracted the attention of the King. In order to hide this attraction from the King's mother and wife, Henriette and Louis invented the story that he was constantly in Henriette's company in order to be close to one of her ladies-in-waiting, Louise de La Vallière. In time, Louis indeed fell in love with Louise and made her his mistress.

Reluctantly, and somewhat bitterly, Henriette stepped aside. She is said to have eventually taken one of her husband's earlier conquests, Armand de Gramont as a lover. This caused all sorts of arguments at the Palais Royal, where the Orléans lived. Despite this marital dissension, several children were born of their union. However, Henriette, known for her fragile and delicate health, had four miscarriages in the space of five years. By the time of the birth of Anne Marie, the couple was notorious for the frequency of their quarrels at court and at home in the Palais-Royal. After joining his brother Louis, the Queen, Mademoiselle, Madame de Montespan and Louise de La Vallière at a military campaign in northern France, the ducal couple returned to Saint-Cloud. It was there that the Duchess died at the age of twenty-six.

The death of the duchess on 30 June 1670 was popularly attributed to poison. The main suspects of this alleged crime were the Duke himself and the Chevalier de Lorraine. Although the duke may not have been involved, the enmity between Minette and the Chevalier de Lorraine was not a hidden truth. After an autopsy was performed, it was reported that Henrietta-Anne had died of peritonitis caused by an ulcer. During his marriage to Henriette-Anne, Philippe was heard to have said that he had loved her for fifteen days.

Children

Grandchildren

Great-grandchildren

Further Descent

Issue by Elisabeth-Charlotte 'Liselotte' of the Palatinate

Elisabeth-Charlotte and Philippe : Relationship Background

Philippe's confidante, Anna Gonzaga, Princess Palatine, arranged his second marriage to her husband's niece, Elisabeth Charlotte, the nineteen-year-old daughter of Charles I Louis, Elector Palatine. Upon her arrival in France, "Liselotte" converted to Roman Catholicism, before the marriage ceremony.

The couple was married by proxy, in the cathedral Saint-Étienne at Metz, on 16 November 1671. The maréchal du Plessis-Praslin represented the Duke of Orléans. Philippe and Liselotte first met on the road between the towns of Châlons and Bellay.

Whereas Philippe's first wife had been known for beauty, charm and wit, Liselotte lacked those graces. Some said that this lack explained why she fared better with her husband (who personally took charge of her toilette for public occasions) than did his first wife. She bore him his only surviving son.

Liselotte also became known for her brusque candor, upright character, lack of vanity, and prolific foreign correspondence about the daily routine and frequent scandals of Versailles. Her letters record how willingly she gave up sharing Philippe's bed at his request after their children's births, and how unwillingly she endured the presence of his minions in their household, which caused the couple to quarrel.

But she frequently acknowledged that Philippe's treatment of her was less offensive than the impertinences his entourage indulged in at her expense, and the lack of protection he afforded her and their children against the hostile intrigues she believed were directed at her by spiteful courtiers, especially Madame-de- Maintenon.

Children

Grandchildren

See also
House of Orléans
Descendants of Louis XIV of France
Descendants of Henry IV of France
Descendants of Philip V of Spain

References

Philippe I, Duke of Orleans
House of Bourbon (France)
House of Bourbon
House of Orléans